Rab C. Nesbitt is a Scottish comedy series which began in 1988. Produced by BBC Scotland, it stars Gregor Fisher as an alcoholic Glaswegian who seeks unemployment as a lifestyle choice. Rab C. Nesbitt was originally a recurring character in the BBC2 sketch series Naked Video (1986–1990).

Background 
The pilot episode, made for BBC Scotland in 1988, was a Christmas special entitled Rab C Nesbitt's Seasonal Greet, which was broadcast on 22 December 1988 and then repeated on the network the following year. The first series began on 27 September 1990 and continued for seven more, ending on 18 June 1999.

The show returned for a one-off special on 23 December 2008.
The special sees several important developments, which carry on into the series: Gash now has a daughter, Peaches; Mary and Ella have set up in business together as cleaners (and Jamesie, Rab and sometimes Gash all work for their company, House Mice); and Rab himself has converted to Christianity and given up alcohol.

A ninth series of six episodes began airing on 21 January 2010. The show's return received a good critical response and high audience figures, leading to a tenth series being commissioned by the BBC for broadcast in 2011. Filming for the series commenced in February 2010, and began broadcasting in October 2011. Following a two-year break, Elaine C. Smith confirmed on her Twitter page that a new year's special had completed filming on 10 October 2013, and was aired on BBC Two on 2 January 2014.

Ian Pattison created and wrote all 65 episodes, and Colin Gilbert produced and directed all 65 episodes as well. Topics include alcoholism, Neo Nazis and sexually transmitted infections. Often several normally unapproachable subjects were used in the same episode. The series is also known for its uncompromising use of Glaswegian accents and dialect, and its technique of breaking the fourth wall by frequently having Rab address the viewer directly.

The series has featured guest appearances from the likes of Norman Lovett, Peter Mullan, Rikki Fulton, Mary Lee, Anita Dobson, Timothy Spall, Stanley Baxter, Kevin McNally, Clive Russell, Jerry Sadowitz, Viv Lumsden, Sylvester McCoy, Russell Hunter, Peter Capaldi and the unknowns David Tennant, Ashley Jensen, Ford Kiernan, Greg Hemphill, Karen Dunbar, Jane McCarry and Paul Riley. Series 10 episode 2 notably featured an appearance by Scottish singer Susan Boyle who was the runner-up on Britain's Got Talent in 2009. The series was taken live on tour in 1991, known as Rab C. Nesbitt: In the Flesh, thus meaning that no new series was broadcast that year. A live recording of the tour was released on VHS in 1992 as Rab C. Nesbitt: Live. Two script books accompanying the series have also been released, alongside Rab's autobiography, a novel entitled A Stranger Here Myself.

In October 2016, it was announced that plans were in place for Rab C. Nesbitt to return with a series of live shows at the SSE Hydro in Glasgow, following in the footsteps of Still Game.

Cast and characters

Nesbitt family 

 Robert "Rab" C. Nesbitt Gregor Fisher [1988–]. alcoholic without denial, sarcastic, deadbeat, self-styled "street philosopher" and "sensitive big bastard", although "sensitive by Govan standards". Described by his wife Mary as not "an unemployed person" but "the original unemployed person", Rab is very rarely seen in anything other than a shabby pinstripe suit, plimsolls, a filthy headband and a string vest. He has two sons, Gash and Burney. Rab has four brothers, all dead; Rab only survived because he was the only one out of the five who was able to understand the benefits form. He claims to have been talented as a teenager, but never went anywhere with it due to Govan-dwellers being scared of talent when they saw it and tried "tae batter it tae death wi' empty wine bottles". At some point before the episode "Clean" he managed to clean up his act, giving up alcohol, helping around the house, finding religion, and presiding over a temperance group; so far he has only relapsed on-screen twice. He is also shown to break the fourth wall.
 Mary "Mary Doll" Nesbitt Elaine C. Smith [1988–]. Rab's long-suffering wife, more functional and aspirational than her husband. Claims that on the day she was born it was a toss-up whether she or the dog's litter would end up at the bottom of the river Clyde in a sack (Burney: "She won. There's nae bloody justice, eh?"). Currently runs a successful house-cleaning business with Ella Cotter called the "House Mice". Mary has repeatedly split up with Rab over the course of the show as has often flirted with other townsfolk to try to get back at him. However, somehow, she and Rab always seem to get back to together, usually for the sake of the "weans" ("little ones"). Mary has had a lot of odd-jobs over the years, often taken as a quickie to pay off a final demand bill or outstanding arrears. Mary has stuck by Rab through many tough situations over the years.
 Gash Nesbitt Andrew Fairlie until 2008, Iain Robertson since 2010 [1988–]. The Nesbitts' elder son. Described by his father as "so anal-retentive he's still shitein’ rusks." Has dabbled with Christianity, hard drugs, Hare Krishna, Scottish nationalism, and ram-raiding BT shops in his efforts to find himself. He has an on-off girlfriend, Bridie, and by the time of the show's return, now has a teenage daughter, Peaches, whom the Nesbitts dote upon. Rab has often taken more interest in Gash than his other son, Burney, and seems to favour Gash as he doesn't give as much lip. Fairlie left the role following the 2008 special, and Robertson was re-cast in the role and appeared from 2010.
 Burney Nesbitt Eric Cullen [1988–1993]. The Nesbitt's younger son, who briefly dabbled with neo-Nazism. Was also discovered to be gifted at painting, although gave up this avenue when he realised it wasn't getting him any sex. Burney often gave his father more grief than his brother, and often became more of a nuisance in his father's eyes. Actor Eric Cullen left the programme following series three due to personal issues, and was replaced by David McKay's Screech. Cullen died in 1996, shortly after he was asked to return to the role of Burney for the 1997 series. In the 2008 Christmas special, it is revealed that Burney died in a "ramming" accident and was buried nearby.
 Screech Nesbitt David McKay [1994–1997]. Rab's nephew, who replaces Eric Cullen's Burney from 1994. Screech comes to live with the Nesbitts after Burney goes to live in at a boarding school. Screech is much more outspoken that his predecessor, and has much more of a rebellious side. He seems to get along with Gash better than Burney did. Actor David McKay earlier portrayed Young Young McGurn's son Bimbo in "That's Entertainment", and was cast in the role of Screech following his initial appearance in 1992. McKay left the role in 1997.

Cotter family 

 James Aaron "Jamesie" Cotter Tony Roper [1988–]. Rab's longtime friend, as well as chronic serial philanderer and self-described 'scumbag'. Jamesie is always seen with his trademark shabby sports jacket and bottle of Irn-Bru. On one occasion, he was described by his wife as "a slippery-lookin' article, about 93-year-old, wearing crusty jeans, with the eyes of an unemployed rapist". On several occasions he has played the part of the devil on Rab's shoulder, urging him to take up drinking again in "Clean". His attitude towards women (he is very keen on having sexual relations with any number of women but refuses to trust them) is implied to have stemmed from a traumatic relationship with his cancer-ridden mother; he spent much of his childhood tending to her, receiving little but abuse in return. It was known that he was once a football player until sustaining a shoulder injury which had forced him to quit.
 Ella Cotter Barbara Rafferty [1988–]. Jamesie's fiery wife, with her red beehive haircut and leopard skin coat. Seems to loathe her husband and frequently considers murdering him. In the meantime, she enjoys torturing him on occasion, notably breaking his shoulder with a crowbar and scratching his sunburnt chest. She has stabbed him at least once. She is every bit as promiscuous as Jamesie. She is part of a house-cleaning business with Mary, called The House Mice. Ella and Jamesie have never had children, due to the fact that Ella had gynaecological problems, a fact which Jamesie cruelly rubs in her face when he gets another woman pregnant.

Pub regulars 

 Andra Brian Pettifer [1988–]. One of Rab's best friends, described more than once as looking "like a Ninja Turtle". Married to a woman called Bobbie whom he finds so repulsive that he dry heaves when thinking about sleeping with her. Andra has a comb-over haircut and is often mocked for being less adventurous than his counterparts. Andra was a regular in the Two Ways Inn before its closure, and quickly transferred his custom to the Giblet. Pettifer reprised the role for the 2014 special, the only pub regular to appear in the episode.
 Dodie Alex Norton in 1988, Iain McColl since 1990 [1988–2011]. Another of Rab's best friends. Dodie is implied to be fond of unconventional methods of intoxication, e.g. sniffing shoe polish, and had an interest in crossdressing also. He too, like Andra, has an insufferable wife whom he loathes and he retches when he thinks about sleeping with her. Dodie did not appear in the 2008 special or Series 9. He also didn't appear in the 2014 special, as McColl had died in 2013 following complications from a cancer diagnosis. McColl was not replaced in the role.
 Dougie Charlie Sim [1988–1992]. The barman of the Two Ways Inn. He was the original owner of the pub before handing the pub over to Norrie following his retirement. Dougie was much more bitter and sour than his successor, and was less tolerant of the acts of the pub regulars than his successor. Sims left the role in 1992 and was replaced by Kazek in the role of Norrie.
 Norrie John Kazek [1992–1999]. The barman of the Two Ways Inn. Norrie takes over the running of the pub after Dougie gives up the job. Norrie is much more tolerant but often steps in when violence is about to break out. Norrie has more of a sensitive side and is willing to show some sympathy when required. He tries to update the pub with foreign grub and games machines. Before he worked in the pub, he was a psychiatric nurse.
 Camille Cora Bissett [2010–]. The barmaid of The Giblet since its opening in 2010. During the episode "Passion", she was the object of both Gash and Jamesie's affections. Bisset did not appear in the 2014 special. Again, it is not known whether she had left the role or was unavailable at the time of filming. She replaced Kazek when he decided not to return to the series.

Recurring cast 

 Hugh "Shug" Nesbitt Sean Scanlan [1990–1999]. A relative of the Nesbitts, Hugh feigns Englishness or at least pretends to be a middle-class Scot due to Scottish cultural cringe and to the distaste displayed at anything working-class and/or Scottish by his wife Phoebe. Hugh is Mary's cousin, and moved to Sidcup at some point in the 1980s.
 Phoebe Sara Corper until 1993, Sarah Crowden until 1996, Juliet Cadzow since 1999 [1990–1999]. An extremely middle-class English woman, married to Hugh. Phoebe is ashamed of his Scottish roots and often displays her disgust when his heritage begins to show.
 Bridie Nicola Park [1998-2011]. Gash's on-off girlfriend, with whom he has a daughter, Peaches. Bridie first appeared in Series 8, and returned to the role for the ninth and tenth series. Again, Park did not appear in the 2014 special, and it is unknown whether Park has left the role or was unavailable for filming.
 Peaches Nesbitt Rachael Crossan until 2011, Anna Devitt since 2014 [2010–]. Gash and Bridie's daughter, upon whom all the Nesbitts dote. Peaches is a teenager by the time of the 2014 special. Crossan originally portrayed Peaches for series nine and ten. However, she did not return for the 2014 special and Devitt was cast in the role instead, making her first appearance.

Notable one-time characters 

"John William Pure Mad Mental Intae Yoor Body Simpson Craig Gemmell Chib The Bam Rib-Racker No Real Young Rebel Ya Bas St. John McGurn aka Young Young McGurn". Portrayed by Maurice Roëves in That's Entertainment. a local "psychotic, with cannibalistic tendencies" who regularly threatens to eat people who displease him. McGurn's family burgle and vandalise local houses with impunity. Unfortunately for Jamesie Cotter, he chose to "whap the meat up" McGurn's daughter Tracey, a fact that very nearly got him eaten himself. In spite of the fact that "no decent human being could hope to strike up a rapport with him", he seems to be quite agreeable towards Rab, entrusting him with his darkest secret: he is a cannibal with false teeth. He commits suicide by jumping from the terrace of a tower block, killing a police inspector, two social workers and a psychologist in the process.

"Gash Nesbitt Sr". Portrayed by Sylvester McCoy. Rab's brother, after whom he named his son. Gash Sr was once highly intelligent but very sensitive, and developed mental illness, either following or coinciding with a period of particularly intense ill treatment by Rab B. Nesbitt, their father. Gash is usually a resident of a special home, yet managed to escape (or merely unconsciously wandered away) to be briefly taken in by the rest of the Nesbitt family during the episode "Father".

"Isa Nesbitt Anna Welsh" (older) & "Ann-Louise Ross" (younger). Rab's mother, a typical Govan housewife, described as being so self-conscious she would put a dish-towel over her knees while watching television because she thought Trevor McDonald could see up her skirt. Rab is shown to have been very close to her, as he describes her as "one of the finest human beings ever to walk this Earth". She died during a gallstone operation in Series 4.

"Robert "Rab" B. Nesbitt". Portrayed by Ronnie Letham. Rab's cantankerous father, described by Gash Sr. as "a monster, a vile, cruel, unpredictable sadist". He blamed his failure on his family and frequently accused his children of holding him back and ruining his life. His moods reduced his wife Isa to a nervous wreck. His preferred victim was his gifted but sensitive son Gash, whom he ultimately drove to insanity through humiliation and abuse. He died from a heart attack when Rab C. finally stood up to him.

"Old Shep". Seen in That's Entertainment". Rab's pet canary which he trains to attack people's groins. Rab is shown to be very fond of his pet and refers to him as a "pit bull canary". Shep was killed during Young Young McGurn's suicidal dive from a tower block, and was given a Viking funeral, with an empty beer can as the boat and part of a Corn Flakes box as a sail.

"Peter The Warlock". Portrayed by Peter Mullan from 'Life Has Meaning'. A Devil worshipper who, after feeling insulted by Rab, places a hex on him, resulting in a dart embedding itself into Rab's cranium. Owns a cloak allegedly once owned by Aleister Crowley (but is most often seen naked) as well as a dog with a unicorn-like horn. Last seen sprinting naked down the street pursued by a furious, pitchfork wielding, Rab.

"Davina". Portrayed by David Tennant. A transgender barmaid who, despite highly speculated gender, holds the affection of everyone.

"The Dosser". Portrayed by Russell Hunter in Ethics. A tramp who attempts to kill himself by jumping into the River Clyde within sight of Rab, who rescues him. The Dosser then blackmails Rab into taking care of him by threatening to commit suicide if he doesn't. In the end, Rab hires a hitman to get rid of him but attempts to call him off when he discovers that the whole thing is a scam.

"The Hitman". Portrayed by Freddie Boardley in Ethics. A hitman hired by Rab to do away with the tramp who is conning him. Appears to have made his career choice by reasons of enjoyment rather than necessity, as when Rab asks him to desist from the murder but keep the money he responds "keep the money, I'll just dae the malky anyway!" In response, Rab hits him over the head with a bin lid (trashcan cover), and he falls into the river, sinking from sight; this prompts Rab to say "An' I always thought shite floated."

"Mambo". Portrayed by Kevin Bridges. Seen living in a lift after he is kicked out of his house for keeping a dolphin in a bathtub. The dolphin had bit his hand off so he decided to get a dog (a Jack Russell). Jamesie pays him 50p to watch his bed which he was planning to give to an immigrant living in a flat but, when he comes back, Mambo and the bed and all of his possessions he had in the lift are gone. He is last seen by Ella coming down the street with the bed.

"The Heebie Jeebie". Voiced by Russell Hunter in Drink. Is a pink elephant that only Rab can see (Cotter can see it at the end of the episode). It tries to convince him not to give up drinking.

"Chingford Steel". Portrayed by Richard E. Grant. The government minister for work whom Mary takes hostage and was made to dress up like Rab and make a ransom video in Scottish accent. He was later freed.

Episodes

Awards

Ratings 

(*) Asterisk indicates overnight figure.

Home releases 

The first five series were initially released on VHS in the 1990s, with each series being split into two parts, with three episodes on each video. "Seasonal Greet" and "Fitba" were each released on separate VHS volumes. A "best of" compilation was also released on VHS. DVD releases of the series began in July 2004, with John Williams productions issuing series one through five on DVD, with "Seasonal Greet" available on a separate DVD volume, and "Fitba" and "Home" being released together on a separate DVD volume. A complete box set of series one through five was later released, including "Fitba" and "Home" but omitting "Seasonal Greet". 2|Entertain then purchased the rights to the series, releasing series six through eight on separate DVD volumes, and all together as one DVD box set, on 15 October 2007. 2|Entertain released "Clean" on DVD three days after its initial airing on TV. In 2009, a complete box set of series one through eight and all subsequent specials was released, making "More" available on DVD for the first time ever. DVDs of series nine and ten were subsequently issued in 2010 and 2011 respectively, leaving the 2014 special the only episode yet to be released on DVD.

Influence 

Johnny Depp based his Glaswegian accent for the role of Tarrant Hightopp, The Mad Hatter in the 2010 film Alice in Wonderland, on Rab C Nesbitt's.

References

External links 
  Comedy Guide
 
 Rab C. Nesbitt at Phill.co.uk
 
 Rab C. Nesbitt at The Comedy Unit
 
 

1988 Scottish television series debuts
2014 Scottish television series endings
1980s British sitcoms
1990s British sitcoms
2000s British sitcoms
2010s British sitcoms
BBC Scotland television shows
BBC television sitcoms
Nesbitt, Rab C.
Govan
Scottish television sitcoms
Television shows set in Glasgow
English-language television shows
1980s Scottish television series
1990s Scottish television series
2000s Scottish television series
2010s Scottish television series